In probability theory, Kolmogorov's zero–one law, named in honor of Andrey Nikolaevich Kolmogorov, specifies that a certain type of event, namely a tail event of independent σ-algebras, will either almost surely happen or almost surely not happen; that is, the probability of such an event occurring is zero or one.

Tail events are defined in terms of countably infinite families of σ-algebras. Then, a tail event  is an event which is probabilistically independent of each finite subset of these random variables. For example, the event that the sequence of the  converges, and the event that its sum converges are both tail events. If each  models the outcome of the -th coin toss in a modeled, infinite sequence of coin tosses, this means that a sequence of 100 consecutive heads occurring infinitely many times is a tail event in this model.

In many situations, it can be easy to apply Kolmogorov's zero–one law to show that some event has probability 0 or 1, but surprisingly hard to determine which of these two extreme values is the correct one.

Formulation 
A more general statement of Kolmogorov's zero–one law holds for sequences of independent σ-algebras. Let (Ω,F,P) be a probability space and let Fn be a sequence of σ-algebras contained in F. Let

be the smallest σ-algebra containing Fn, Fn+1, ….

Kolmogorov's zero–one law asserts that, if the Fn are stochastically independent, then for any event , one has either P(E) = 0 or P(E)=1.

The statement of the law in terms of random variables is obtained from the latter by taking each Fn to be the σ-algebra generated by the random variable Xn. A tail event is then by definition an event which is measurable with respect to the σ-algebra generated by all Xn, but which is independent of any finite number of Xn. That is, a tail event is precisely an element of the terminal σ-algebra .

Examples
An invertible measure-preserving transformation on a standard probability space that obeys the 0-1 law is called a Kolmogorov automorphism. All Bernoulli automorphisms are Kolmogorov automorphisms but not vice versa. The presence of an infinite cluster in the context of Percolation theory also obeys the 0-1 law.

See also
 Borel–Cantelli lemma
 Hewitt–Savage zero–one law
 Lévy's zero–one law
 Long tail
 Tail risk

References
.

External links
 The Legacy of Andrei Nikolaevich Kolmogorov Curriculum Vitae and Biography. Kolmogorov School. Ph.D. students and descendants of A. N. Kolmogorov. A. N. Kolmogorov works, books, papers, articles. Photographs and Portraits of A. N. Kolmogorov.

Probability theorems
Covering lemmas